Northern Championship Wrestling (Les Promotions NCW Inc.) is an independent professional wrestling promotion based in Montreal, Quebec, Canada.

History
Founded in 1986 by François Poirier and Phil Bélanger in Joliette, Quebec as the Amateur Wrestling Association, while in high school. In 1992, they changed their name to Lutte Lanaudière, as they moved from Joliette to Lanaudière. In 1995, they changed their name to its current name Northern Championship Wrestling, and moved to Montreal in 1996, running wrestling shows at the Centre Notre-Dame de Rosaire (Centre N.D.R.) from 1996 to 2009 and at Saint-Barthelemy Center in from 2009 to 2013. Currently shows are held at Centre LGH (10015 ave Bruxelles, Montréal Nord).

On August 13, 2005, shortly after his departure from World Wrestling Entertainment (WWE), the promotion hosted Lance Storm for a show called SummerStorm in order to promote his new Storm Wrestling Academy. Storm got involved in the main event, doing a run-in to help Manuel Vegas retain the NCW Quebec title against Chakal.

Sylvain Grenier wrestled for the promotion from November 2002 until starting full-time with WWE at No Way Out 2003. He first wrestled former NCW Quebec Champion Manuel Vegas, then defeated NCW wrestlers Chakal, Chase Ironside and Nova Cain.

Sylvain returned to NCW at ChallengeMania 15 on May 19, 2007. Still under contract with WWE, he tagged with Don Paysan and Bishop to defeat Chakal, Nightmare and Phil Bélanger in the Main Event. After his release from WWE, Sylvan returned to NCW, wrestling Franky The Mobster at Montreal Chairshot Massacre in October 2007.

On August 23, 2008, NCW hosted a wrestling SuperShow involving The Honky Tonk Man, Johnny Devine and Bushwhacker Luke.

Since 1995, NCW wrestlers such as Chakal, Franky The Mobster, Nova Cain and Don Paysan have been ranked in the Pro Wrestling Illustrated's PWI 500.

In April 2009, nCw drew 600 for Abdullah The Butcher's Last Match in Canada.

In September 2009, nCw hosted their first edition of NCW Femmes Fatales which regrouped many fighting female in North America. NCW Femmes Fatales was announced in April 2010 to be part of the Female Fight League during the 45th Edition of the Cauliflower Alley Club Reunion in Las Vegas.

In November 2009, they gave an hommage to Maurice Vachon and Paul Vachon as part of a documentary tracing back Mad Dog's career.

Championships

Current championships

Retired championships

NCW Hall of Fame

 – Entries without a birth name indicates that the inductee did not perform under a ring name.
 – This section mainly lists the major accomplishments of each inductee in the promotion.

See also
Professional wrestling in Canada
List of professional wrestling halls of fame

References

External links
 Official website
 archived

1986 establishments in Quebec
Canadian professional wrestling promotions
Professional wrestling in Montreal